Sean William Willis (born 6 January 1995) is an Australian cricketer. He made his List A debut on 20 July 2014 for the Australia National Performance Squad against South Africa A, as part of the Australia A Team Quadrangular Series in 2014.

Willis played both cricket and Australian rules football during his school days at The Hutchins School, Tasmania, and has also played Australian rules football for North Hobart Football Club and Hobart City Football Club in the TSL.

In September 2018, he was named in the Hobart Hurricanes' squad for the 2018 Abu Dhabi T20 Trophy. He made his Twenty20 debut for the Hobart Hurricanes in the 2018 Abu Dhabi T20 Trophy on 5 October 2018. He made his first-class debut for Tasmania in the 2018–19 Sheffield Shield season on 12 March 2019.

References

External links

1995 births
Living people
Cricketers from Tasmania
Hobart Hurricanes cricketers
North Hobart Football Club players
Tasmania cricketers